Bad Blood is the sixth studio album by US electronica duo Blood on the Dance Floor, released internationally on September 3, 2013. Although not reaching the same success as their previous effort, Evolution, it is their second-best selling release to date, peaking at No. 137 on the Billboard 200 albums chart.

Background
At the beginning of 2013, there were major rumors claiming Blood on the Dance Floor had split when they withdrew from the Soundwave Festival. However, it turned out to be a hoax. Vanity completely denied all rumors of Blood on the Dance Floor disestablishing. In 2020, the 10th track of this album titled "Something Grimm" was brought up as plagiarism of the 2006 track "The Last Night" by Christian alternative rock band Skillet on the album Comatose.

The group released Bad Blood on September 3, 2013. On February 18, 2013 the lead single "I Refuse to Sink! (Fuck the Fame)" was released, followed by the second single "Crucified By Your Lies", followed by the third single, "Something Grimm", on July 2, 2013.

Critical reception

David Jeffries from AllMusic gave the album a mixed-to-positive review, noting the lyrics referring to lead singer Dahvie Vanity's rape allegations, and gave both positive and negative comments towards the themes the album addresses. He concluded his review by crediting the band's growth, saying "Bad Blood is better than before, or at least, bloodier."

Track listing

Charts

References

2013 albums
Blood on the Dance Floor (duo) albums